The English Football League One, known as Sky Bet League One for sponsorship purposes or simply League One in England, is the second-highest division of the English Football League and the third tier overall in the English football league system.

Introduced in the 2004–05 English football season as Football League One, it is a rebrand of the former Football League Second Division, which itself is a rebrand of the now-defunct Football League Third Division prior to the 1992 launch of the Premier League.

Presently, Fleetwood Town holds the longest tenure in this division, previously being absent in 2013–14 season following promotion from League Two. There are 8 former Premier League clubs currently competing in this division; Barnsley (1997–98), Bolton Wanderers (1995–96, 1997–98 and 2001–2012), Charlton Athletic (1998–99 and 2000–2007), Derby County (1996–2002 and 2007–08) Ipswich Town (1992–1995 and 2000–2002), Milton Keynes Dons (as Wimbledon 1992–2000), Portsmouth (2003–2010) and Sheffield Wednesday (1992–2000).

Structure
There are 24 clubs in this division. Each club plays each club twice (once at home and once away). Three points are awarded for a win, one for a draw and zero for a loss. At the end of the season a table of the final League standings is determined, based on the following criteria in this order: points obtained, goal difference, goals scored, an aggregate of the results between two or more clubs (ranked using the previous three criteria), most matches won, most goals scored away from home, fewest "penalty points" based on yellow and red cards received, followed by fewest straight red cards for certain offenses. If two or more teams are still tied after examining all of these criteria, they will share the higher place between them. The only exception would be if the tied teams span the boundary between 2nd and 3rd, 6th and 7th, or 20th and 21st place, in which case one or more play-off matches would be arranged between the tied clubs.

At the end of each season the top two clubs, together with the winner of the play-offs between the clubs which finished in the third to sixth positions, are promoted to EFL Championship and are replaced by the three clubs that finished at the bottom of that division.

Similarly, the four clubs that finished at the bottom of EFL League One are relegated to EFL League Two and are replaced by the top three clubs and the club that won the fourth to seventh place play-offs in that division.

Current members

 
The following 24 clubs are competing in League One during the 2022–23 season.

Teams promoted from League One
 
For past winners at this level before 2004, see List of winners of the EFL League One and predecessors.

Play-off results

Relegated teams

Expelled in August 2019 after financial breaches.

Top scorers

In 35 games. Season truncated due to coronavirus

Attendances
EFL League One is the most-watched third-tier domestic sports league in the world, with an average of 8,802 spectators per game in the 2019–20 season. The closest third tier association football league in terms of average attendance is the Germany 3. Liga (6,185). The highest average attendance since the restructure into League One was the 2021–22 season, with an average of 9,953. The highest average attendance by a single club was Sunderland in the 2018–19 season with 32,157. They also set the League One attendance record for a single game in the same season, when 46,039 spectators attended the Boxing Day game against Bradford City.

Historic performance 
Since the restructuring into League One in 2004, 75 teams have spent at least one season in the division, including 8 of the 20 teams in the 2022–23 Premier League. Milton Keynes Dons has spent 15 seasons in League One, the most of any team. Oldham Athletic's single 14-season consecutive spell was the longest of any team. The team with the current longest tenure is Fleetwood Town, who have been in League One continuously since the 2014–15 season. Rotherham United and Peterborough United have had the highest number of separate spells in League One with five each. There have been 15 different Champions of League One, with Wigan Athletic having won the division three times.

Key
   Teams with this background and symbol in the "Club" column will be competing in the 2022–23 EFL League One 
   Team will be competing in the 2022–23 Premier League
  The club competed in League One during that season (the number is the club's final league position)

Financial Fair Play
Beginning with the 2012–13 season, a Financial Fair Play arrangement has been in place in all three divisions of the Football League, the intention being eventually to produce a league of financially self-sustaining clubs. In League One, this takes the form of a Salary Cost Management Protocol in which a maximum of 60% of a club's turnover may be spent on players' wages, with sanctions being applied in the form of transfer embargoes.

See also
 1920–21 (as Football League Division Three)
 1921–22 & 1957–58 (as Football League Division Three North/South)
 1958–59 & 1992–93 (as Football League Division Three)
 1992–93 & 2003–04 (as Football League Division Two)
 List of professional sports teams in the United Kingdom

Footnotes

References

External links

 
 EFL League One clubs' locations
 England League One – Predictions, Tips, Statistics

EFL League One
Football leagues in England
English Football League
2004 establishments in England
Sports leagues established in 2004
Third level football leagues in Europe
Professional sports leagues in the United Kingdom